George Petrie (September 8, 1793 – May 8, 1879) was a U.S. Representative from New York.

Born at Little Falls, New York, Petrie attended the common schools, worked as a store clerk, and became a merchant, operating a store in partnership with his brother Richard.

He was active in the militia, serving as quartermaster of his regiment during the War of 1812.  He later attained the rank of major general as commander of the New York Militia's 1st Division of Riflemen.  He also served in local offices, including justice of the peace.

Petrie was elected as an Independent Democrat to the Thirtieth Congress (March 4, 1847 – March 3, 1849)

He was employed as a clerk in the Post Office Department in Washington, D.C. from January 1, 1869 until August 31, 1875, when he resigned.

He died at Little Falls, New York, May 8, 1879. He was interred in Church Street Cemetery.

References

External links

1793 births
1879 deaths
Independent Democrat members of the United States House of Representatives
Members of the United States House of Representatives from New York (state)
New York (state) Democrats
New York (state) Independents
American militiamen in the War of 1812
American militia generals
Burials in New York (state)
19th-century American politicians